SBEF may refer to:

San Bruno Education Foundation, a nonprofit charity based in San Bruno, California